Khürelkhüügiin Bolortuyaa (born 3 May 1996) is a Mongolian freestyle wrestler. She represented Mongolia at the 2020 Summer Olympics in Tokyo, Japan.

Career 

In 2019, she won the silver medal in the women's 65 kg event at the Asian U23 Wrestling Championship held in Ulaanbaatar, Mongolia. She also won the silver medal in the women's 62 kg event at the 2021 Asian Wrestling Championships held in Almaty, Kazakhstan.

She qualified at the World Olympic Qualification Tournament in Sofia, Bulgaria to represent Mongolia at the 2020 Summer Olympics in Tokyo, Japan. She competed in the women's freestyle 62 kg event.

In January 2022, she won one of the bronze medals in the women's 57 kg event at the Golden Grand Prix Ivan Yarygin held in Krasnoyarsk, Russia. In February 2022, she won the silver medal in the 57 kg event at the Yasar Dogu Tournament held in Istanbul, Turkey.

In April 2022, she won a bronze medal at the Asian Championships in Ulaanbaatar, Mongolia.

Major results

References

External links 
 
 
 

1996 births
Living people
Mongolian female sport wrestlers
Asian Wrestling Championships medalists
Wrestlers at the 2020 Summer Olympics
People from Erdenet
Olympic wrestlers of Mongolia
21st-century Mongolian women